Phulwari is a 1984 Indian Hindi-language drama film directed by Mukul Dutt and produced by Tarachand Barjatya. The screenplay was also written by Dutt. It stars Debashree Roy and Shashi Puri. The music was composed by Raj Kamal with lyrics by Taj Quadri and R N Gustakh.

Plot
Arun meets Rajiv Mathur, the newly assigned welfare inspector of the Forest office at the station. Rajiv says that he is headed for Talpur. Arun informs him that Talpur is very far from that place and offers Arun his hospitality for that day. Rajiv arrives at his place and discovers that he is a rich person. Arun also discovers that Rajiv is carrying a flute with him. At night he requests Rajiv to play the flute. While playing the flute, they are interrupted by the sudden arrival of a beautiful young woman at his room. The young woman happens to be Lali, the  younger sister of Arun. On the next day, He drops Rajiv to his allocated office.

Rajiv attends Lali's birthday party but is interrupted by Pyare, a servant at Arun's house, who informs him that a man from his provision has been severely bitten by a mad dog and immediately needs to be taken to the doctor. Just when Rajiv is about leave, Lali stalls him saying that it is simply Pyare's job to take the wounded man to the doctor. She continues saying that this whole thing is being done in order to spoil her birthday party. Rajiv is stunned at Lali's rudeness and openly declares that she is selfish who does not care for anyone except herself.

Lali once comes to visit Rajiv and apologises for her behaviour to him. Eventually she began to visit him and Rajiv slowly forms an affection towards her. Lali, one day inquires Rajiv as to whether he loves her. Rajiv initially fumbles but finally confesses to her his feelings. Lali also smartly declares that she is also in love with him. Arun arranges for Rajiv and Lali's wedding. In the meantime Lali once arrives at Rajiv's place but is unable find him there. She looks for him here and there and discovers him along with Mangli, his maid servant in a brook. Lali forms the prejudice that Rajiv has an illegitimate affair with Mangli and intends to marry her only because of her wealth. On the day of their wedding Lali fumes at Rajiv. She declares in front of everyone that she is no more willing to marry him as she thinks that he is a fraud and hypocrite.

Mangli comes to visit Lali and reveals that she accidentally fell into the brook and Rajiv luckily saved her life on the day she discovered them far from the top of the hill. A repentant Lali, once again arrives at Rajiv's place but discovers that Rajiv has left without any information about where he has headed to. Gradually, Lali becomes dejected and to find solace she goes on a pilgrimage. Once standing on the bank of a river, she feels that her life has come to a meaningless term. Feeling guilty, she flings herself into the river but is saved by some of the people who were present at that moment. When she regains her consciousness, she meets an elderly woman to whom she tells everything about her life. Now that woman endeavours to reinstate her faith and hope. Coincidentally Rajiv appears and it is discovered that he is the son of that woman. Lali fails to restrain her tears and falls at his feet. Rajiv forgives her and they reunite.

Cast

Debashree Roy as Lali Chaudhury
Shashi Puri as Rajiv Mathur
Benjamin Gilani as Arun Chaudhary
Naaz as Shobha
Rakesh Bedi as Pyare, Servant
Iftekhar as Mr Chaudhary , Lali Father
Kishore Kapoor as Prakash Khatri
Rajendra Nath as Dr.Gupta
Sulochana Latkar as Rajiv's Mother 
Shivraj as Kaka
Jankidas as Antique Shop Owner
Pallavi Dutt (Introducing - her first film)
Mohan Choti as Municipal Dog Catcher
Ashok Saraf as Manu, Cyclerickshaw Driver
Viju Khote as Horse Trainer
Jayshree T. as Mangli
Junior Mehmood as Raviraj
Dinesh Hingoo as Mohan

Crew

Soundtrack
The music of the film was composed by Raj Kamal. Govind Moonis write the songs.

"Maine Tumko Hi Maa Jaana" - Haimanti Shukla, Raj Kamal
"Chanchal Naina Mohini Chitvan" - K. J. Yesudas
"Jao Saiyan Aise Na Churao" - Haimanti Sukla
"Mausam Kitna Pyara Hai" - K. J. Yesudas, Haimanti Sukla
"Sanwari Saloni Aisi" - K. J. Yesudas
"Jaan Marelo, Goliyan Kamaal Karelo" - K. J. Yesudas
"Jab Jab Baithe Hum Rikshe Par" - Haimanti Shukla

References

External links
Phulwari on IMDb

1984 films
Films scored by Raj Kamal
1980s Hindi-language films
1984 drama films
Indian drama films
Hindi-language drama films